A. P. Shah Institute of Technology is a private engineering college located in Kasarvadavali, in Thane, India. It was established in 2014 and is managed by the Parshvanath Charitable Trust.

It is a Jain religious minority College (i.e., 51% of all seats are reserved for students from the Jain religious minority community) and is affiliated to the University of Mumbai (a public university, funded by the state government of Maharashtra). The college is approved by the Indian Government's All India Council for Technical Education (AICTE) and is recognized by the Directorate of Technical Education (DTE) of the state Government of Maharashtra.

It offers a Bachelor of Engineering (B.E.) degree in Civil engineering, Computer engineering, Computer engineering in data science and AI, Ml respectively, Electronics, and telecommunication engineering, Information Technology, and Mechanical engineering. All of these courses last for 4 years.

Campus and location
The five-story campus on Ghodbunder Road in Kasarvadavali Naka is owned by the Parshvanath Charitable Trust. Wi-Fi is available on campus and there is wide use of closed-circuit TV cameras for security.

In addition to small shops and restaurants in the area, there is the Big Bazar Mall, McDonald's fast-food restaurant, and commercial buildings like that of G-Corp. The Sanjay Gandhi National Park (forest) is a short distance away and can be seen from the main road, as can portions of Vasai Creek.

Admissions
Admissions to the seats not reserved for the Jain religious minority, for first-year undergraduate engineering programs, are carried out via the Centralized Admissions Process (CAP) of the State Government's Directorate of Technical Education (DTE). Entrance examinations are used: 85% of CAP seats are filled using the Composite Score followed by the Joint Entrance Examination score and HSC score (Maharashtra state students only). The remaining 15% of CAP seats are filled using the Composite Score after the Joint Entrance Examination score and HSC score (students for other Boards of Education).

Each engineering branch takes in 60 students. This intake is only for admissions to the first year of the 4-year B.E. degree program but includes direct admissions to the second year for Jain students who have completed 3-year engineering diplomas.

As a private college, it also has some "institute-level seats" which are filled on merit basis.

Place distribution is shown below:

Departments
The college has the following academic departments:

Mechanical Engineering
The department laboratories include the following:
 CAD (computer-aided design) / CAM (computer-aided manufacturing) Lab
 Heat and Mass Transfer Lab
 Fluid Mechanics Lab
 Refrigeration and Air Conditioning Lab
 Mechatronics Lab
 Hydraulic Machinery Lab
 Workshop and Machine Shop
 Internal Combustion Engine Lab
 Materials Testing Lab (shared with the Department of Civil Engineering)
 Incubation Lab
MQE Lab
IC Engine Lab

Electronics and Telecommunications Engineering

This department is equipped with the following laboratories:
 Television Engineering and PCB Lab.
 Power Electronics and Drives Lab.
 Electronic Circuit Lab.
 Digital Electronics and Microprocessor Lab.
 Control Systems Lab.
 Electrical Networks Lab.
 Communication Lab.

Information Technology
This department houses several specialist laboratories to extend the general computing provision. The labs are equipped with specialist software such as Oracle, Microsoft Visual Studio, Java, the Adobe Creative Suite, and many other key products. The main corporate operating system is Microsoft Windows, but many labs have Linux installed as well. All labs provide free Internet access.

There is also a specialist networking lab that is equipped with more than 20 enterprise-level network switches and routers, including wireless and VoIP devices. There are a dedicated security and software forensics laboratory. There are also many special-purpose facilities for embedded system development and robotics.

The following laboratories are managed by this department:
 Project / Research and Development Lab.
 Software Testing Lab.
 Computer Graphics and Image Processing Lab.
 Web Engineering Lab.
 Network Security Lab.
 System Software Lab.
 Database and Server Security Lab.
 Mobile Computing Lab.

Computer Engineering

The department has 400+ nodes and 12 servers all networked with Linux, Microsoft Windows, and NOVELL NetWare.

The department facilities include the following:

Operating Systems
Windows 2003, Novell NetWare 3.12, MS-DOS 6.22, Ubuntu

Compilers
C GNU, C++ GNU, Java GNU, Fortran GNU, Turbo PASCAL, MS Visual Studio 6.0

Application Software
Octave, Circuit simulators, VHDL toolkit, UML tools.

Database Support
MS SQL 2000 Server, MY SQL Server, PostGRE Server.

Civil Engineering

This department has the following laboratories:
 Engineering Geology Lab.
 Soil Mechanics Lab.
 Transportation Lab.
 Environmental Engineering Lab.
 Concrete Technology Lab.
 Building Material and Construction Lab.
 Strength of Materials Lab (shared with the Department of Mechanical Engineering).

Applied Sciences and Humanities

The department of applied sciences and humanities does not offer any degrees of its own, but supports the curriculum of other departments by offering courses in the following disciplines:
 Applied Mathematics (first 4 or 5 semesters in each branch).
 Applied Physics (first 2 semesters).
 Applied Chemistry (first 2 semesters).
 Communication Skills (second semester).
 Presentation and Communication Techniques (third semester of each branch).
 Environmental Studies (fifth semester of each branch except civil engineering).

In the 4-year Bachelor of Engineering curriculum of the University of Mumbai, the first year (i.e., the first 2 semesters) is shared by all engineering majors. Thus, first-year students of the Parshvanath College of Engineering were managed by the department of applied sciences and humanities, rather than the departments of the engineering branches that they had taken admission in.

The department of applied sciences and humanities has the following laboratories:
 Applied Chemistry Lab
 Applied Physics Lab
 Computer Programming Lab
 Engineering Mechanics Lab
 Language Lab (for the subjects of communication skills and presentation & communication techniques)
 Basic Electrical & Electronics Engineering Lab
 Sci Lab (for Scilab software taught in applied mathematics)

Library

The college library is equipped with 22843 books covering 5025 titles. It was spread over an area of about 400 square meters. The college, as an associate member of INDEST AICTE Consortium, had subscribed for 42 national and 21 international journals. The library was supported with online access for members.

The library had two reading rooms (one of which is air-conditioned), a reference section (for using books without taking them out of the library), and an internet surfing section for students and staff members.

Students could either take books for "reference" (returning them on the same day) or for "issue" (returning them after a maximum duration of one week).
A book bank is also provided by the library to students from 3rd semester and hard copy of notes to first-year students.

References

External links
 Official website of the A. P. Shah Institute of Technology.

Jain universities and colleges
Private engineering colleges in India
Engineering colleges in Mumbai
Affiliates of the University of Mumbai
Education in Thane district
Educational institutions established in 2014
2014 establishments in Maharashtra